Eupithecia sublata is a moth in the family Geometridae first described by András Mátyás Vojnits in 1994. It is found in Tanzania.

References

Moths described in 1994
sublata
Moths of Africa